Soloukhin is a surname. Notable people with the surname include:

 Rem Soloukhin (1930–1988), Soviet scientist
 Vladimir Soloukhin (1924–1997), Russian poet and writer

See also
 Solodukhin